Z21 Wilhelm Heidkamp was one of six Type 1936 destroyers built for the Kriegsmarine (German Navy) in the late 1930s. Completed a few months before the start of World War II in September 1939, the ship served as a flagship throughout her career. She briefly patrolled the Skagerrak where she inspected neutral shipping for contraband goods. Z21 Wilhelm Heidkamp later helped to lay four offensive minefields off the English coast that claimed two British destroyers, 2 fishing trawlers, and twenty-seven merchant ships. During the German invasion of Norway in April 1940, she sank a Norwegian coastal defense ship off Narvik and was crippled with the opening shots of the First Naval Battle of Narvik on 10 April, with the loss of 81 crewmen. The ship sank the following day.

Design and description
Her crew consisted of 10 officers and 313 sailors.

The ship carried five  SK C/34 guns in single mounts with gun shields, two each superimposed, fore and aft of the superstructure. The fifth mount was positioned on top of the rear deckhouse. The guns were numbered from 1 to 5 from front to rear. Her anti-aircraft armament consisted of four  SK C/30 guns in two twin mounts abreast the rear funnel and six  C/30 guns in single mounts. The ship carried eight above-water  torpedo tubes in two power-operated mounts. Two reloads were provided for each mount. She had four depth charge launchers and mine rails could be fitted on the rear deck that had a maximum capacity of 60 mines. 'GHG' (Gruppenhorchgerät) passive hydrophones were fitted to detect submarines and an active sonar system was installed by the end of 1939.

Construction and career
Z21 Wilhelm Heidkamp was named after Machinist's mate (Obermaschinist) Wilhelm Heidkamp. He was in charge of the pumps on the battlecruiser  during the Battle of Dogger Bank on 24 January 1915. After a British shell started a large fire in the ship's aft gun turrets, he was badly burned when he turned the valves to flood the aft magazines, thus saving the ship.

The ship was ordered from AG Weser (Deschimag) on 6 January 1936. She was laid down at Deschimag's Bremen shipyard as yard number W923 on 14 December 1937, launched on 20 August 1938, and commissioned on 20 June 1939. After working up, Z21 Wilhelm Heidkamp became the flagship of the Commander of Torpedo Boats (Führer der Torpedoboote) Rear Admiral (Konteradmiral) Günther Lütjens and patrolled the Skagerrak to inspect neutral shipping for contraband goods in late September.

The British were unaware of the minefield's existence and lost seven ships totaling . On the night of 12/13 November Z21 Wilhelm Heidkamp, now the flagship of the Commander of Destroyers (Führer der Zerstörer), Captain (Kapitän zur See) Friedrich Bonte, escorted Z18 Hans Lüdemann, Z19 Hermann Künne, and Z20 Karl Galster as they laid 288 magnetic mines in the Thames Estuary. Once again unaware of the minefield's existence, the British lost the destroyer  and thirteen merchant ships displacing 48,728 GRT. Less than a week later, Z21 Wilhelm Heidkamp, Z19 Hermann Künne, and  laid 180 magnetic mines in the Thames Estuary on the night of 17/18 November. The mines sank the destroyer , a fishing trawler, and seven ships of 27,565 GRT.

The minefield only claimed one fishing trawler of 251 GRT.

In retaliation for the Altmark Incident where the Royal Navy seized captured British sailors from the German tanker Altmark in neutral Norwegian waters on 16 February, the Kriegsmarine organized Operation Nordmark to search for Allied merchant ships in the North Sea as far north as the Shetland Islands. Z20 Karl Galster and Z21 Wilhelm Heidkamp escorted the battleships Scharnhorst and Gneisenau as well as the heavy cruiser Admiral Hipper during the sortie between 18 February and 20 February.

Norwegian Campaign

Z21 Wilhelm Heidkamp was the flagship for Group 1, commanded by Commodore (Kommodore) Bonte, for the Norwegian portion of Operation Weserübung in April 1940. The group's task was to transport the 139th Mountain Infantry Regiment (139. Gebirgsjäger Regiment) and the headquarters of the 3rd Mountain Division (3. Gebirgs-Division) to seize Narvik. The ships began loading troops on 6 April and set sail the next day. On 9 April, Z21 Wilhelm Heidkamp sank the old coastal defense ship  with torpedoes after an attempt to get her captain to surrender failed. Afterwards, she landed her troops in Narvik without resistance and then refuelled from the whale factory ship . Bonte intended for his flagship to patrol the fjord during the night, but Brigadier General (Generalmajor) Eduard Dietl, commander of the 3rd Mountain Division, requested that Z21 Wilhelm Heidkamp remain in harbor to ease coordination between the Army (Heer) and the Kriegsmarine and to facilitate communications with his commanders.

Shortly after dawn on 10 April, the ship was moored aft of Jan Wellem, in Narvik harbor, when the five destroyers of the British 2nd Destroyer Flotilla, Hardy, Havock, Hunter, Hotspur, and Hero appeared. Z21 Wilhelm Heidkamp was struck in the stern by a torpedo from Hardys first salvo that detonated the ship's aft magazine. The explosion threw her aft guns into the air and killed 81 men, including Bonte. Although Z21 Wilhelm Heidkamps stern was below water, her captain, Lieutenant Commander (Korvettenkapitän) Hans Erdmenger, managed to moor her to a nearby Swedish freighter. She capsized the following day, but not before her torpedoes were transferred to the surviving destroyers. Her survivors joined the other survivors ashore in an ad-hoc naval infantry unit.

Notes

References

External links
 Kriegsmarine destroyers

1938 ships
Ships built in Bremen (state)
Type 1936 destroyers
Maritime incidents in April 1940
World War II shipwrecks in the Norwegian Sea
Naval magazine explosions